The sixth season of That '70s Show, an American television series, began October 29, 2003, and ended on May 19, 2004. It aired on Fox. The region 1 DVD was released on May 8, 2007. This season is set in 1978 for the first seven episodes of the season. The series transitions to 1979 beginning with the eighth episode of the season ("I'm a Boy"). 

All episodes are named after songs by The Who.

Cast

Main cast 
Topher Grace as Eric Forman
Mila Kunis as Jackie Burkhart
Ashton Kutcher as Michael Kelso
Danny Masterson as Steven Hyde
Laura Prepon as Donna Pinciotti
Wilmer Valderrama as Fez
Debra Jo Rupp as Kitty Forman
Kurtwood Smith as Red Forman
Don Stark as Bob Pinciotti

Special guest
Seth Green as Mitch Miller
Estella Warren as Raquel
Shannon Elizabeth as Brooke
Alyson Hannigan as Suzy Simpson
Rachel Bilson as Christy
Luke Wilson as Casey
Morgan Fairchild as Carolyn

Special guest appearance
Jim Gaffigan as Roy
Billy Dee Williams as Pastor Dan
Tanya Roberts as Midge Pinciotti

Special appearance
Brooke Shields as Pamela Burkhart

Recurring
Jim Rash as Fenton
Christina Moore as Laurie Forman
James Avery as Officer Kennedy

Guest
Dan Castellaneta as Agent Armstrong
Ashley Drane as Julie

Episodes

References 

 That '70s Show Episode Guide at The New York Times

External links 
 
 

2003 American television seasons
2004 American television seasons
Television series set in 1978
Television series set in 1979
6